Betty Zane is an unincorporated community in Ohio County, West Virginia, United States. It is located to the east of the village of Clearview. The town is named after Betty Zane, who is believed to have saved Fort Henry by fetching gunpowder and ammunition while under siege during the American Revolutionary War.

References

Unincorporated communities in Ohio County, West Virginia
Unincorporated communities in West Virginia